Gonodactylidae is a family of mantis shrimp. It contains these genera:
Gonodactylaceus Manning, 1995
Gonodactylellus Manning, 1995
Gonodactyloideus Manning, 1984
Gonodactylolus Manning, 1970
Gonodactylopsis Manning, 1969
Gonodactylus Berthold, 1827
Hoplosquilla Holthuis, 1964
Hoplosquilloides Manning, 1978c
Neogonodactylus Manning, 1995

References

Stomatopoda
Crustacean families